La Ronge is a northern town in the boreal forest of central Saskatchewan, Canada. La Ronge lies on the western shore of Lac la Ronge, is adjacent to Lac La Ronge Provincial Park, and is on the edge of the Canadian Shield.

This town is also the namesake of the larger La Ronge population centre comprising the community, the Northern Village of Air Ronge and the Kitsakie 156B and Lac La Ronge 156 reserves of the Lac La Ronge First Nation.

History 
The name of La Ronge comes from the lake. The origin of the name is uncertain; the most likely explanation is that early French fur traders named it la ronge (literally the chewed) because of the large amount of beaver activity along the shoreline—many of the trees would have been chewed down for beaver dam construction.

In 1782, Swiss born fur trader Jean-Étienne Waddens had a fur trade post on Lac La Ronge. In March 1782, Waddens was fatally wounded in a quarrel with his associate Peter Pond.

La Ronge began in 1904 as a fur trading post and meeting place, but with the decline of hunting and the fur market, La Ronge has diversified into other areas. Many of the Dene, Cree, and white trappers used La Ronge as their central service point. It incorporated as a northern village on 3 May 1905.

With the extension of Highway 2 from Prince Albert in 1947, La Ronge became a major tourist fishing area. The highway between La Ronge and Prince Albert expanded the community further in the 1970s after it was paved.

In the early 1950s and 1960s, the mineral resources in the La Ronge area began to be explored and developed.

La Ronge's status changed from northern village to industrial town in 1965 and then to town on 1 November 1976 before finally becoming a northern town on 1 October 1983.

Wildfire evacuations 

In May 1999, the community of La Ronge was evacuated after a fire burned through the far north of the town. The wildfire burned multiple houses before conditions pushed the fire away from the town and crews were able to extinguish it.

Once again in July 2015, La Ronge was threatened by dangerous forest fires that combined forcing approximately 7,000 people to evacuate from their homes. Many cabins and homes were burnt. The fire came within 2 km of La Ronge and burned completely around the La Ronge Airport making it difficult to fight the fire from air with smokey conditions and unreliable weather making the fight against the fires very difficult. In total there were over a hundred fires burning in Northern Saskatchewan at once which forced over 13,000 residents to flee their homes, resulting in the province's largest evacuation ever. The fires were caused by low precipitation in the winter and summer months and also high temperatures.

Geography 

La Ronge is surrounded by several First Nations reserves, with the Northern Village of Air Ronge located just south of the community on Highway 2. With access to all other points north, east and west, and transportation linkage to the south, La Ronge is also the northern hub for the Saskatchewan provincial government.

Climate 
La Ronge experiences a borderline subarctic climate (Köppen Dfc), slightly below the threshold of a humid continental climate. Winters are long, dry and very cold while summer is short, warm and wetter. Precipitation is low, with an annual average of 486.2 mm.

Demographics 

Population centre 
The La Ronge population centre, the thirteenth largest population centre in the province, comprises four adjoining census subdivisions including the Northern Town of La Ronge, the Northern Village of Air Ronge and the Kitsakie 156B and Lac La Ronge 156 Indian reserves of the Lac La Ronge First Nation.

In the 2016 Census, Statistics Canada reported that the La Ronge population centre had a population of 5,671 living in 1,704 of its 1,927 total dwellings, a +6.6% change from its 2011 population of 5,318.

The following is a population breakdown of the La Ronge population centre by census subdivision.

Economy 
Several mining companies, government agencies, and airlines now keep offices in La Ronge, and the local Chamber of Commerce has many other retail and service businesses amongst its members.

La Ronge Wild Rice Corporation processes freshly harvested wild rice (in August to October) from Northern Saskatchewan farmers.

Tourism also brings in many of people to the La Ronge area. In the summer time, many people visit the Lac La Ronge Provincial Park which is Saskatchewan's largest Provincial Park.

Sports 

The community is also home to the La Ronge Ice Wolves ice hockey team of the Saskatchewan Junior Hockey League, La Ronge minor hockey association and the La Ronge Crushers men's hockey league and the La Ronge women's hockey league. La Ronge also has a minor baseball program with many teams and age groups.

La Ronge is home to an 8 team Ladies Slopitch League - JRMCC Ladies Slopitch (slow-pitch softball). The Churchill Community High School and the Senator Myles Venne High School both have many sports programs and partake in the Saskatchewan High School Athletic Association. There are many other sports available in the community including volleyball, broomball, curling and a women's hockey program.

Government 
In 2009, La Ronge elected 21-year-old councillor Thomas Sierzycki as its mayor. This established La Ronge as having one of the youngest mayors in Canada. Sierzycki stayed in office for two terms up until October 2016 when he decided not to run for a third term after a failed bid to land himself a seat as a Saskatchewan MLA with the Saskatchewan Party in the April 2016 election.

Education 
There are two high schools and three elementary schools in La Ronge and Air Ronge. High schools include Churchill Community High School and / Senator Myles Venne High School. Elementary schools in La Ronge and Air Ronge include Pre-cam Community School, Gordon Denny Community School, and Bells Point Elementary School.

Northlands College maintains its main campus in La Ronge and took over the Nortep / Norpac program after the Saskatchewan provincial government cut funding to the program in March 2017.

Transportation 

La Ronge is connected to southern Saskatchewan by Highway 2, which continues north as Highway 102. La Ronge is served by the La Ronge (Barber Field) Airport and the La Ronge Water Aerodrome.

Notable people 

 Danis Goulet, Cree-Métis film director and screenwriter

See also 
 List of towns in Saskatchewan
 List of communities in Saskatchewan
 List of Indian reserves in Saskatchewan

References

External links

Division No. 18, Saskatchewan
Northern towns in Saskatchewan